Þorsteinn Gunnarsson (born 1940) is an Icelandic actor and architect. He is known for his role as Eirikur in the Icelandic TV-series Trapped. In 2003 he was nominated for an Edda Award for his role in Nói Albinói.

Selected filmography
 Hrafninn flýgur (1984) 
 Foxtrot (1988)
 Áramótaskaup 1990 (1990) as various roles
 Nói Albinói (2003) as Headmaster Þórarinn
 Dís (2004) as Magga's Father
 Mýrin (2006) as Holberg
 Sumarlandið (2010)
 Fúsi (2015)
 Bakk (2015)
 Grafir & Bein (2016)
 Trapped (2015-2016) (TV-series) as Eiríkur

Personal life
Þorsteinn has worked as an architect involved in restoring several Icelandic churches.

References

External links 
 

Living people
1940 births
Thorsteinn Gunnarsson
Thorsteinn Gunnarsson
Thorsteinn Gunnarsson
Place of birth missing (living people)
Date of birth missing (living people)
Thorsteinn Gunnarsson
Ecclesiastical architects